The consorts of Brazil were the spouses of the reigning monarchs, using the titles of Queen of Brazil or Empress of Brazil from the establishment of the United Kingdom of Portugal, Brazil and the Algarves in 1815 to the abolition of the Empire of Brazil in 1889. Brazil had a reigning Queen, but was already widowed at the time of her reign and therefore there was never officially a male consort.

Queen consort of the United Kingdom of Portugal, Brazil and the Algarves

House of Braganza, 1815–1822

Empress consort of the Empire of Brazil

House of Braganza, 1822–1889

See also
List of Brazilian monarchs
List of Portuguese consorts
Princess of Brazil

 
Brazil
Brazil
Royal consorts